Jamie Craig Webber (born 21 January 1998) is a South African soccer player who plays as a midfielder for South African Premier Division side SuperSport United.

Club career
After playing for Vasco da Gama and Stellenbosch in the National First Division, he joined SuperSport United in January 2018.

International career
He was called up to the South Africa squad in June 2017 for the COSAFA Cup, and made his debut for South Africa in the competition.

He has also represented South Africa at under-23 level.

References

External links

Living people
1998 births
South African soccer players
Association football midfielders
Vasco da Gama (South Africa) players
Stellenbosch F.C. players
SuperSport United F.C. players
National First Division players
South African Premier Division players
South Africa international soccer players
South Africa youth international soccer players